The Louis-Hippolyte Lafontaine Bridge–Tunnel is a highway bridge–tunnel running over and beneath the Saint Lawrence River. It connects the Montreal borough of Mercier–Hochelaga-Maisonneuve with the south shore of the river at Longueuil, Quebec.

It carries the Autoroute 25 expressway and passes beneath the main shipping channel in the Saint Lawrence River immediately downstream from the Saint Lawrence Seaway. It surfaces on Île Charron (Îles de Boucherville at entrance/exit #1 of Autoroute 25), then continues by bridge to Longueuil. The bridge-tunnel sees about 120,000 daily crossings, of which 13% are trucks. Its construction began in 1963 and it opened on March 11, 1967.

History
In 1960, the construction of the Trans-Canada Highway (TCH) through Quebec from the Ontario border to Rivière-du-Loup was announced. In Montreal, to avoid having to build a huge bridge that would have disfigured the city and destroyed a neighbourhood, engineers opted for the construction of a tunnel located under the Saint Lawrence River and dug a trench under the river bed and buried the tunnel sections  to  under the river bed.

The Longue-Pointe church had to be demolished to make way for the tunnel, and 300 families were expropriated from the village in 1964. The construction was completed in March 1967, just before the opening of Expo 67. Construction cost $75 million.

A major four-year refurbishment of the tunnel began in 2020, originally planned to complete in 2024 at a cost of $1.2 billion, but in 2022 it was announced that the project would take a year longer than expected, completing in 2025 at a total cost of $2.1 billion.

Specifications

It is one of the largest prestressed concrete structures in the world and is the longest bridge-tunnel in Canada.

See also
List of crossings of the Saint Lawrence River
List of bridges in Canada
List of bridges in Montreal

References

External links
 Louis-Hippolyte Bridge–Tunnel (A-25) at Steve Anderson's montrealroads.com
 

Bridges in Montreal
Bridge–tunnels in North America
Transport in Longueuil
Bridges over the Saint Lawrence River
Tunnels completed in 1967
Bridges on the Trans-Canada Highway
Tunnels on the Trans-Canada Highway
Buildings and structures in Longueuil
Mercier–Hochelaga-Maisonneuve
Road bridges in Quebec
Road tunnels in Quebec
Immersed tube tunnels in Canada
1967 establishments in Quebec